

List of countries

Central Asia